Crawford W. Beveridge CBE is a Scottish-American technology executive.

Beveridge, originally from Scotland, attended the University of Edinburgh, earning a B.Sc. in social science. He followed that with an M.Sc. in industrial administration from the University of Bradford.

He was given the honor of a Commander of the Order of the British Empire in 1995 and was elected a Fellow of the Royal Society of Edinburgh in 2016.

Beveridge's business background included Hewlett-Packard, Digital Equipment Corp. and Analog Devices. In 1985, he joined Sun Microsystems as vice president of corporate resources, where he stayed until 1991, when he left and took the position of chief executive of Scottish Enterprise.

In 2000, he returned to Sun to fill the position of executive vice president people and places and chief human resources officer. He was a board member of corporations outside of Sun, including Autodesk, Memec and Scottish Equity Partners. He is a non-executive chairman of the board in Autodesk and as of July 2016, Beveridge owns approximately $1.9 million worth of Autodesk shares.

He was executive vice president and chairman, EMEA, APAC and the Americas of Sun in 2007.

He chairs the Scottish government's Council of Economic Advisers.

References

External links 
 Crawford Beveridge Bio Page on Autodesk

Scottish chief executives
Commanders of the Order of the British Empire
Alumni of the University of Bradford
Alumni of the University of Edinburgh
Living people
Year of birth missing (living people)
Human resource management people
Autodesk people